NBC is a television broadcast network in the United States.

NBC may also stand for:

Art, entertainment, and media

Broadcasting
 NBC Radio Network, a defunct U.S. radio network
 NBC Blue Network, a defunct U.S. radio network
 NBC PNG, Papua New Guinea
 Namibian Broadcasting Corporation, Namibia
 Nation Broadcasting Corporation, Philippines
 Newfoundland Broadcasting Company, Canada, now CJON-DT
 Norwegian Broadcasting Corporation, Norway
 Nagasaki Broadcasting, Japan

Ensembles
 National Ballet of Canada, a dance group

Games
 NeoGeo Battle Coliseum, a tag team fighting game

Venues
 Neal Blaisdell Center, a concert hall

Commerce
 National Bank of Cambodia, the Cambodian central bank
 National Bank of Canada, a financial institution
 National Bank of Commerce (disambiguation), various banks
 National Bedding Company, a mattress manufacturer
 National Biscuit Company, now Nabisco

Government
 National Biosecurity Committee, a government body managing aspects of biosecurity in Australia
 National Book Council, a Maltese public entity dedicated to the promotion of Maltese literature and the book industry in Malta
 National Business Center, part of the Department of the Interior of the United States
 Natural-born-citizen clause, one of the requirements for the office of the President of the United States
 Naval Base Coronado, a United States Navy base
 Northampton Borough Council

Religion
 National Baptist Convention (disambiguation), various church denominations
 Nazarene Bible College, a school

Sports 
 National Basketball Competition, the governing body of the National Basketball League (Australasia) since July 1, 2013
 National Baseball Congress, an organisation of United States leagues
 National Billiard Council, now Billiard Congress of America
 Nippon Bass Club, a fishing organisation in Japan
 Nürnberger Basketball Club, a professional basketball club from Nuremberg, Germany

Transportation
 National Bus Company (Australia), bus operator in Australia between 1993 and 2013
 National Bus Company (UK), bus operator in the United Kingdom between 1969 and 1988
 New Beckenham railway station, London, National Rail station code NBC
 NBC, IATA code of Begishevo Airport in Tatarstan, Russia

Other uses
 Nahr al-Bared Camp, a refugee camp
 Naive Bayes classifier, a classifier based on Bayes' theorem
 Neotropical Bird Club, a birdwatching group
 Naturalis Biodiversity Center
 Next Byte Codes, a programming language
 Non-brewed condiment, a vinegar substitute
 Nuclear, biological, and chemical; now Chemical, biological, radiological, and nuclear
Weapon of mass destruction
NBC suit, a type of military personal protective equipment